Norelgestromin/ethinylestradiol, sold under the brand name Ortho Evra among others, is a contraceptive patch containing the progestin norelgestromin and the estrogen ethinylestradiol.

The most common side effects include headache, nausea (feeling sick), breast tenderness,  and irregular uterine bleeding.

Norelgestromin/ethinylestradiol is a transdermal patch (a patch that delivers a medicine across the skin). For the first three weeks of the menstrual cycle a new patch should be applied every week, followed by a fourth week, which is patch-free. The patch-free interval must not be longer than seven days; otherwise, additional non-hormonal contraceptive methods must be used, such as condoms. Transdermal patches must always be applied on the same day of the week to the buttock, abdomen (belly), upper arm or upper back. The same area of skin should not be used for two consecutive patches. Norelgestromin/ethinylestradiol may work less well in women weighing  or more.

Norelgestromin/ethinylestradiol was approved for medical use in the United States in November 2001, and in the European Union in August 2002. It is available as a generic medication.

Medical uses 
In the United States norelgestromin/ethinylestradiol is indicated for the prevention of pregnancy in women with a BMI < 30 kg/m2 for whom a transdermal delivery system is an appropriate method of contraception.

In the European Union, norelgestromin/ethinylestradiol is indicated for use as female contraception.

See also
 Combined injectable contraceptive
 Contraceptive vaginal ring
 Oral contraceptive formulations
 List of combined sex-hormonal preparations

References

External links
 

Combined hormonal contraceptives
Transdermal patches